Family is an ITV crime drama series, first broadcast on 29 September 2003, starring Martin Kemp and Jamie Foreman as two gangster brothers operating in London's East End. Family ran for one series, comprising six episodes. A DVD of the complete series was released on 30 March 2009.

Plot
Family follows a family of London gangsters headed by Ted Cutler (David Calder). One of his sons, Joey (Martin Kemp), is happily married with two children and tries to keep 'business' separate from home life, while the other son, Dave (Jamie Foreman) is a loose cannon with a nasty temper who has just returned from America, where he fled following a family rift. Only Joey sees a way out by running a high class restaurant - but this venture is not without violence.

Production
Jamie Foreman devised and co-wrote the show alongside scriptwriters Tim Vaughan and Roger Smith. Nick Elliott, controller of ITV drama, said of the series;

"Jamie plays the loopy brother, while Martin is like Al Pacino's character in the Godfather, desperately wanting to be straight but going along with the dodgy stuff. There will also be this father figure. It's a contemporary London gangster show and it will have a lot of authenticity. There'll be a contrast between Martin living a normal suburban lifestyle, then going to meetings to discuss rubbing someone out and being involved in rackets and organised crime. He's got a wife and a daughter who takes cello lessons, who don't know about the other life he leads."

Elliott commissioned the six-part series alongside Granada South drama controller, Michele Buck.

Reception
Family was well received by critics and media buyers, who welcomed it as part of a "quality-based offensive" in ITV's autumn schedule. But after a respectable start with 6.1 million viewers watching on 29 September, the programme lost nearly two million viewers, drawing only 4.3 million in the same slot four weeks later. Although there were only two more episodes to be aired, Nigel Pickard, Head of ITV's programming, ditched the show from its prime time slot and consigned it instead to a graveyard slot of 11:30pm on Wednesdays. This meant that the episode previously scheduled for 27 October 2003 was replaced with a re-run of Airline.

Cast
 Martin Kemp as Joey Cutler; Ted youngest son
 Jamie Foreman as Dave Cutler; Ted's eldest son
 David Calder as Ted Cutler; head of the Cutler family
 Simone Lahbib as Jacqueline Cutler; Joey and Dave's younger sister
 Camille Coduri as Sophie Cutler; Joey's wife
 Holley Chant as Yvonne Cutler; Dave's wife, whom he met in America
 Sally Dexter as Natalie Parton; Ted's long-term partner
 Rachel Crowther as Esmee Cutler; Joey and Sophie's eldest daughter
 Florence Bass as Georgia Cutler; Joey and Sophie's youngest daughter
 Linda Marlowe as Jean Cutler; Ted's ex-wife and mother of his children
 Matt Bardock as Inspector Mickey Fowler; a corrupt police officer
 Phil McKee as DS Bob Fletcher; a murder squad detective
 Peter Marinker as Ronnie; an ex-con working as the Cutler's business manager
 Danny Midwinter as Graham; Joey and Dave's driver and general skivvy
 Crispin Bonham-Carter as Mike; a suspected undercover cop, who is Jacqueline's love interest
 Charles Daish as Rory MacLeod; co-owner of McLeod's, a high-class restaurant in the East End
 Pandora Clifford as Jenny McLeod; co-owner of McLeod's, who is married to Rory's
 Jo Joyner as Lucy; service manager at McLeod's, and Dave's love interest
 Samuel Clemens as Paul; waiter at McLeod's

Episodes

References

External links

2003 British television series debuts
2003 British television series endings
2000s British drama television series
ITV television dramas
2000s British television miniseries
Television series about families
Television series about organized crime
Television series by ITV Studios
London Weekend Television shows
English-language television shows
Television shows set in London
Films directed by David Drury